Mut-bisir or Mutu-bisir (fl. 19th century BC) was a senior military official to the Amorite king Shamshi-Adad I. His name appears repeatedly in the Mari letters, and means "man of Bishri", referring to the desert region around the Jebel Bishri. In these letters, Anson Rainey describes him as "frequently mentioned in connection with troops located near the Euphrates."

In one such letter, from Mut-bisir to Shamshi-Adad, he was the first recorded individual to refer to Canaanites by name (in Akkadian, Kinaḥnum). In this letter, Mut-bisir describes his own soldiers and opposing Canaanite forces as tensely watching one another.

His residence in Mari seems to have eventually been given to Shibti, the daughter of Shamshi-Adad, and this household became a major supplier of foods to the royal palace.

References

Amorite people
19th-century BC people